Ultrapetrol is an Argentinian river barges operator. It has worked with companies such as Petrobras.

In early 2017, Ultrapetrol (Bahamas) Ltd was authored by a New York judge to begin chapter 11 bankruptcy proceedings. At the time, it was "owner of one of the largest shipping businesses in South America."

See also
 NASDAQ Transportation Index

References

External links
Official website

Shipping companies of Argentina